Martti Kullervo Mölsä (born 2 April 1952 in Kihniö, Finland) is a Finnish politician. He was first elected to parliament in 2011,  representing the Finns Party. Reelected in 2015, as a member of the Finns Party, Mölsä and 19 others established the New Alternative parliamentary group on 13 June 2017, which later became Blue Reform.

References

External links 
 Official page of Martti Mölsä

1952 births
Living people
People from Kihniö
Finns Party politicians
Blue Reform politicians
Members of the Parliament of Finland (2011–15)
Members of the Parliament of Finland (2015–19)